Wat Yannawa, commonly known in English as "the boat temple", is a Buddhist temple (Wat) in Bangkok on Charoen Krung Road, Sathon district. The temple has a long history from the Ayutthaya era to the present. During the rule of King Rama III, a viharn was built in the shape of a Chinese junk, giving the temple the nickname "the boat temple". This construction inside the temple houses a space where people pray; a nearby ubosot enshrines Buddha images and illustrations of the Loi Prathip Royal Lantern Festival. Additional exterior buildings enshrine a Buddha relic from Sri Lanka and the Goddess of Mercy.

History 
The temple was built during the Ayutthaya Kingdom, before the founding of Bangkok. It was originally called Wat Kok Khwai because the community of Dawei people in the area bought and sold buffalo; later, it was renamed as Wat Kok Krabue.

During the reigh of King Rama I, the temple gained royal status and the ubosot was built. During the reign of King Rama III, a viharn was built in the shape of a Chinese junk. The temple was renamed as Wat Yannawa, which translates as "the boat temple". The two chedis on the deck represent masts and the altar at the back represents the wheelhouse. Because of this unique structure, locals call the temple “sampao chedi” ("the Chinese junk with chedis"). King Rama III chose the shape of a junk as a means of historical preservation; he believed the junk was becoming obsolete due to new ship types, and wanted to preserve its image.

Gallery

Interior 
The "stern" of the ship enshrines four Buddha statues and replica footprints, including Thai and Chinese inscriptions. The larger chedi has 20 wooden recesses, while the smaller one has 16. There is also a room dedicated to relics, which some believe to come from Buddha. The ubosot enshrines the principle of subduing Mara Buddha image and includes other buddha images. Interestingly, on the doors and windows are painted images of a yaku jar, a jar used for offerings in a royal ceremony. On the upper part of the door and back of the room is drawn a big Krathong in the style of used in the Loi Prathip Royal Lantern Festival. This kind of picture, at this size, is rare in Thailand.

Exterior 

Three statues of the Goddess of Mercy are enshrined in a separate, Chinese-style temple, and a building enshrines a Buddha relic from Sri Lanka.

Wanglee community 
The land for Wat Yannawa was donated by the Wanglee family, one of Bangkok's five big Thai business families of Chinese descent. Wat Yannawa became the owner and leases the buildings to the occupants, but some descendants of the original tenants still live there. The Wanglee family have lived in Bangkok since King Rama V (1868–1910). In 2469, the Wanglee family built a row of houses based on the designs of a French architect. These old two-story shophouses are located in Soi Charoen Krung 52 (or Soi Wanglee) near the Chao Phraya River, just south of the Taksin Bridge station.

Just beyond the old houses used to be the river pier where mid-19th century Chinese immigrants disembarked after their long and hazardous sea journeys. Most of Bangkok's Thai–Chinese community is of Teochew descent, a dialect group originating in Swatow (Shantou) on the eastern coast of Guangdong, China.

The Wanglee estate served as a home for the extended family, a private river port to service the family's trading interests, and had extensive godown (warehouse facilities) with associated offices. Included is a shrine to Mazu, a Chinese goddess of the sea and maritime activity, fitting for a family whose wealth depended so much on sea trade. The center of the family's business activities has since shifted to Bangkok's modern business district, but the compound remains in family hands. After renovations, the family generously opened the compound in 2017 to the public. It is now known as Lhong 1919. Facilities include cafes, boutique shops, and art galleries, but most importantly, the compound now hosts regular cultural events, theatrical performances, and exhibitions. This area has not been taken over for another high-rise condominium or hotel project. This preserves an important part of Bangkok's commercial history and Chinese immigration heritage. In this regard, Lhong 1919 is an important heritage site not just for Thailand but for all of Southeast Asia, showcasing how local Chinese commercial minorities made such an important contribution in terms of economic development and regional commercial integration.

Location and visiting 

Wat Yannawa is located at 40 Charoenkrung Rd., Yannawa, Sathorn, Bangkok 10120. Wat Yannawa can be seen from the Chao Phraya River. The easiest way to go there is taking BTS Skytrain to Saphan Taksin then taking Exit 4; or, taking the orange, yellow, or green line of the Chao Phraya River Express boat and getting off at Sathorn pier and walking a bit to temple. Possible bus routes include 1, 15, 17, 35, 75, 163, 504, 544, and 547.

The temple gate is open from 8am until 6pm. There is no admission for entry.

Contact 
Facebook: วัดยานนาวา พระอารามหลวง

Wat Suthiwararam (Thai:วัดสุทธิวราราม), Wat Borom Sathon Sri Sutthi Sophon Rangsan (Thai:วัดบรมสถลศรีสุทธิโสภณรังสรรค์) (Wat Don)(Thai:วัดดอน)

See also
Buddhist temples in Thailand
Architecture of Thailand
Thai temple art and architecture
Knowing Buddha
List of Buddhist temples

References

Yan Nawa
Sathon district
19th-century Buddhist temples
19th century in Siam
Registered ancient monuments in Bangkok
Buildings and structures on the Chao Phraya River